John Edward Neil "Jack" Wiebe  (May 31, 1936 – April 16, 2007) was a Canadian farmer and politician. He served as a provincial politician, the 18th Lieutenant Governor of Saskatchewan and also as a Senator.

Born in Herbert, Saskatchewan, Wiebe graduated from the University of Saskatchewan after which he founded a major farming operation in Main Centre and was owner and president of L&W Feeders Ltd. from 1970 to 1985. He attended Luther College high school and graduated in 1953.

He was a third generation resident of Herbert. His great grandfather, Jacob Wiebe, a German-Russian Mennonite, emigrated from Russia to Kansas in 1874. His grandfather, John F.D. Wiebe, settled in Saskatchewan in 1905 and became Herbert's first mayor when the community was incorporated as a township in 1912. His father, Herbert Wiebe, was elected mayor in 1928 and held the post until 1954.

He was elected as a Liberal in a 1971 by-election as a Member of the Legislative Assembly of Saskatchewan for the constituency of Morse. He was re-elected in 1975 and retired from the legislature in 1978.

From 1994 to 2000, he was Lieutenant Governor of Saskatchewan, carrying out such duties as reading the Speech from the Throne, swearing in premiers and Cabinet ministers, opening legislative sessions, and bestowing honours upon Saskatchewan citizens.

In 2000, he was appointed by Jean Chrétien to the Senate representing the senatorial division of Saskatchewan. It was highly unusual for a former vice-regal representative to return to party politics so quickly. He sat as a federal Liberal and resigned in 2004, seven years before the mandatory retirement age, for family reasons.

Upon his retirement, Wiebe volunteered his time with the Dr. Noble Irwin Regional Healthcare Foundation, helping to raise millions of dollars to furnish the new regional hospital in Swift Current, Saskatchewan.

Wiebe died on April 16, 2007, aged 70, from lung cancer. A state memorial service was held on April 24 in Swift Current.

See also
Monarchy in Saskatchewan
Government House (Saskatchewan)

References

External links
 
Wiebe, John E.N. (1936–2007), Encyclopedia of Saskatchewan
Jack Wiebe Family History Faspa Country: A Herbert Story

1936 births
2007 deaths
Canadian Mennonites
Canadian people of German-Ukrainian descent
People from Rural Municipality Excelsior No. 166, Saskatchewan
Lieutenant Governors of Saskatchewan
Canadian senators from Saskatchewan
Liberal Party of Canada senators
Members of the Saskatchewan Order of Merit
21st-century Canadian politicians
Farmers from Saskatchewan
Deaths from lung cancer
Deaths from cancer in Saskatchewan
Saskatchewan Liberal Party MLAs